Dichrooscytus is a genus of plant bugs in the family Miridae. There are more than 70 described species in Dichrooscytus.

Species
These 77 species belong to the genus Dichrooscytus:

 Dichrooscytus abietis Bliven, 1956
 Dichrooscytus adamsi Knight, 1968
 Dichrooscytus albidovirens Reuter, 1896
 Dichrooscytus algiricus Wagner, 1951
 Dichrooscytus alpinus Kelton, 1972
 Dichrooscytus altaicus Josifov, 1974
 Dichrooscytus angustifrons Knight, 1968
 Dichrooscytus apicalis Knight, 1968
 Dichrooscytus asanovae Josifov, 1974
 Dichrooscytus aztecus Kelton, 1972
 Dichrooscytus barberi Knight, 1925
 Dichrooscytus brevirostris Kelton, 1972
 Dichrooscytus bureschi Josifov, 1974
 Dichrooscytus consobrinus Horvath, 1904
 Dichrooscytus consorbinus Horvath, 1904
 Dichrooscytus convexifrons Knight, 1968
 Dichrooscytus cuneatus Knight, 1968
 Dichrooscytus cyprius Lindberg, 1948
 Dichrooscytus dalmatinus Wagner, 1951
 Dichrooscytus deleticus Knight, 1968
 Dichrooscytus dentatus Kelton, 1972
 Dichrooscytus elegans Heidemann, 1892
 Dichrooscytus flagellatus Kelton, 1972
 Dichrooscytus flagitiosus Kelton & Schaffner, 1972
 Dichrooscytus flavescens Knight, 1968
 Dichrooscytus flavivenosus Knight, 1968
 Dichrooscytus fuscosignatus Knight, 1968
 Dichrooscytus gustavi Josifov, 1981
 Dichrooscytus impros Heiss, 1988
 Dichrooscytus inermis Wagner, 1974
 Dichrooscytus intermedius Reuter, 1885
 Dichrooscytus irroratus Van Duzee, 1912
 Dichrooscytus josifovi Kerzhner, 1997
 Dichrooscytus juniperi Lindberg, 1948
 Dichrooscytus junipericola Knight, 1968
 Dichrooscytus kerzhneri Josifov, 1974
 Dichrooscytus kiritshenkoi Josifov, 1974
 Dichrooscytus lagopinus Bliven, 1956
 Dichrooscytus latifrons Knight, 1968
 Dichrooscytus longirostris Kelton, 1972
 Dichrooscytus maculatus Van Duzee, 1912
 Dichrooscytus major Wagner, 1962
 Dichrooscytus mexicanus Kelton, 1972
 Dichrooscytus minimus Knight, 1968
 Dichrooscytus minutus Kelton & Schaffner, 1972
 Dichrooscytus nanae Wagner, 1957
 Dichrooscytus nitidus Knight, 1968
 Dichrooscytus ochreus Kelton, 1972
 Dichrooscytus oxycedri
 Dichrooscytus persicus Josifov, 1974
 Dichrooscytus pinicola Knight, 1968
 Dichrooscytus pseudosabinae Reuter, 1896
 Dichrooscytus putshkovi Josifov, 1974
 Dichrooscytus rainieri Knight, 1968
 Dichrooscytus repletus (Heidemann, 1892)
 Dichrooscytus rostratus Kelton, 1972
 Dichrooscytus ruberellus Knight, 1968
 Dichrooscytus rubidus Kelton, 1972
 Dichrooscytus rubromaculatus Kelton, 1972
 Dichrooscytus rufipennis (Fallén, 1807)
 Dichrooscytus rufivenosus Knight, 1968
 Dichrooscytus rufusculus Kelton, 1972
 Dichrooscytus rugosus Knight, 1968
 Dichrooscytus seidenstueckeri Josifov, 1974
 Dichrooscytus sequoiae Bliven, 1954
 Dichrooscytus suspectus Reuter, 1909
 Dichrooscytus taosensis Kelton & Schaffner, 1972
 Dichrooscytus tauricus Seidenstucker, 1954
 Dichrooscytus tescorum Bliven, 1956
 Dichrooscytus texanus Kelton & Schaffner, 1972
 Dichrooscytus toltecus Kelton, 1972
 Dichrooscytus uhleri Wheeler & Henry, 1975
 Dichrooscytus utahensis Knight, 1968
 Dichrooscytus valesianus Fieber, 1861
 Dichrooscytus visendus Bliven, 1956
 Dichrooscytus vittatipennis Knight, 1968
 Dichrooscytus vittatus Van Duzee, 1921

References

Further reading

 
 
 

Articles created by Qbugbot
Mirini